Albina Kochkina-Tuzova was a former Soviet female speed skater. She won a silver medal at the World Allround Speed Skating Championships for Women in 1961, and a bronze medal in 1962.

References

External links
 Иркутскому спорту - 95!

Soviet female speed skaters
World Allround Speed Skating Championships medalists
1929 births
1984 deaths